Jevdet Bey or Cevdet Tahir Belbez (1878 – January 15, 1955) was an Ottoman Albanian governor of the Van vilayet of the Ottoman Empire during World War I and the Siege of Van. He is considered responsible for the massacres of Armenians in and around Van. Clarence Ussher, a witness to these events, reported that 55,000 Armenians were subsequently killed. He is also considered responsible for massacres of Assyrians in the same region.

He was born in Shkodra, Ottoman Empire, as the son of Tahir Pashë Krajani, who was a vali of Van, Bitlis, and Mosul. He also became the brother-in-law of Enver Pasha. In 1914, as the Kaymakam of the Sanjak of Hakkari, Djevdet worked closely together with the Ottoman Secret Service to coordinate the defense against the Russians and possible offensives against the region around Lake Urmia. He wrote to Talaat Pasha that Urmia could have been captured with some more support of his superiors. He succeeded Hasan Tahsin Bey as Governor of the Vilayet of Van in 1914. As such, he ordered a massacre of about 800 Assyrians in Salmas in March 1915.

Djevdet was a leader of the Committee of Union and Progress (CUP) and the brother-in-law of Enver Pasha.

He was portrayed by Elias Koteas in the 2002 film Ararat, which received 2 Oscar nominations.

See also
 Armenian genocide
 Greek genocide

Further reading

References

Armenian genocide perpetrators
Ottoman people of World War I
Enver Pasha
Sayfo perpetrators
Albanians from the Ottoman Empire
People from Shkodër
Political people from the Ottoman Empire
1878 births
1955 deaths